Herbert Smith was an English professional footballer who played as a forward.

Career
Born in Bradford, Smith moved from Liversedge to Bradford City in May 1925. He made 5 league appearances for the club, before being released in 1926.

Sources

References

Date of birth missing
Date of death missing
English footballers
Liversedge F.C. players
Bradford City A.F.C. players
English Football League players
Association football forwards
Footballers from Bradford